Zorritos District is one of the three districts of the province Contralmirante Villar in Peru.

References